The Congregation of the Blessed Sacrament, commonly known as the Sacramentinos is a Catholic Clerical Religious Congregation of Pontifical Right for men (priests, deacons, and brothers) founded by St. Pierre-Julien Eymard. Its members use the nominal letters S.S.S. which is the acronym of its official name in Latin, after their names. By their life and activities, they assist the Church in her efforts to form Christian communities whose center of life is the Eucharist. They commit themselves to the implementation of this ideal in collaboration with lay men and women engaged in various ministries.

History
The Congregation of the Blessed Sacrament, was founded in Paris, France, on May 13, 1856, by a French priest, Saint Peter Julian Eymard. As he searched for a response to the needs and challenges of his time, he found the answer in the love of God manifested in a special way in the Eucharist. During Eymard's lifetime, the character of French Catholicism was changing from a religion of guilt and fear to a religion based on God's mercy and love. Eymard was a leading figure in this transition.

Founder – St. Peter Julian Eymard

Eymard was born February 4, 1811, at La Mure, Isère, France. He was a contemporary and friend of Peter Chanel, John Vianney, Marcellin Champagnat, and the sculptor, Auguste Rodin. On July 20, 1834, Eymard was ordained a priest for the Diocese of Grenoble, and in 1839 he joined the Marist Fathers. He worked with the Third Order of Mary and other lay organizations promoting devotion to the Blessed Virgin Mary and to the Eucharist, particularly the Forty Hours Devotion.

Eymard became familiar with the practice of sustained eucharistic worship during a visit to Paris in 1849, when he met with members of the Association of Nocturnal Adorers who had established exposition and perpetual adoration of the Blessed Sacrament at the Basilica of Our Lady of Victories. Eymard, with permission from the Paris bishops, on May 13, 1856, left the Marist order and founded the Congregation of the Blessed Sacrament for men. The first community was established at 114 rue d’Enfer, Paris. In 1858 he, along with Marguerite Guillot, founded the Servants of the Blessed Sacrament, a contemplative congregation for women.

Eymard died on August 1, 1868. He was declared venerable in 1908, beatified in 1925, and canonized by Pope John XXIII on December 9, 1962. On December 9, 1995, Saint Peter Julian Eymard, priest, was inserted into the General Roman Calendar with the rank of optional memorial.

Eymard's mission in the Church consisted in promoting the centrality of the Eucharistic Mystery in the whole life of the Christian community, as the font and fullness of all evangelization and striking expression of the infinite love of the divine Redeemer for humankind. Since the Holy Eucharist clearly marked the life and pastoral activity of Peter Julian Eymard, he is known as an outstanding apostle of the Eucharist.

The Congregation of the Blessed Sacrament began working with children in Paris to prepare them to receive their First Communion. It also reached out to non-practicing Catholics, inviting them to repent and begin receiving Communion again. In 1859 he opened a second community at Marseilles and placed in charge of it his first companion, Fr. Raymond De Cuers. A third foundation was established at Antwerp and two others at Brussels, along with a formation house or novitiate at Saint-Maurice in the Diocese of Versailles.

Eucharistic charism

Members of the Congregation believe that Christ in the Eucharist has the power to effect a radical transformation in the society and in all people, motivating and strengthening everyone to work for the establishment of Christ's Kingdom on earth. Each religious proclaims the reality of God's love in the Eucharist by his "gift of self" to Him and his brothers and sisters. By prayer in the presence of the Blessed Sacrament and an active apostolic life, he strives to make Christ in the Eucharist better known and loved.

Eymard was a tireless proponent of frequent Holy Communion, an idea given more authoritative backing by Pope Pius X in 1905.

Mission

Following in the footsteps of Eymard, the mission of the Congregation of the Blessed Sacrament is "to respond to the hungers of the human family with the riches of God's love manifested in the Eucharist."

Conscious of a call to bear prophetic witness to the Eucharist, members of the Congregation commit themselves to the renewal of Church and society through this sacrament, especially by gathering communities characterized by hospitality, reconciliation, and service; and celebrating the Eucharist as the source and summit of the life of the Church.

By their lives and activities, they share in the mission of the Church, so that the Eucharist may be celebrated in truth, that the faithful may grow in their communion with the Lord through Eucharistic adoration in the setting of solemn exposition, that they may commit themselves to the renewal of their Christian communities, and collaborate in liberating individuals and society from the forces of evil.

United in Spirit with those who are poor and weak, they oppose everything which degrades human dignity and they proclaim a more just and brotherly world as they await the coming of the Lord.

The Congregation today
Since its founding, the members of the congregation have reached all continents of the globe and continue the mission begun by St. Peter Julian Eymard. Currently numbering a little less than a thousand religious, they are present in thirty different countries throughout the world.

Notable members

Archbishop Aldo di Cillo Pagotto
Bishop Jorge Alves Bezerra
Bishop Sofronio Aguirre Bancud
Bishop Martin Boucar Tine
Bishop Julian Winston Sebastian Fernando
Bishop Édouard Kisonga Ndinga
Bishop Paulo Mandlate
Bishop Johannes Gerardus Maria van Burgsteden

References

External links
 Congregation of the Blessed Sacrament, USA
 Congregation of the Blessed Sacrament, Philippines
 Congregation of the Blessed Sacrament, Italy
 Center Eucharistia, Blessed Sacrament Fathers and Brothers, Rome
 Congregation of the Blessed Sacrament, UK
 Blessed Sacrament Fathers, India
 Emmanuel magazine
 Santuario Eucaristico, Philippines

Catholic orders and societies
Catholic missionary orders
Institutes of consecrated life
Religious organizations established in 1856
Catholic religious orders established in the 19th century
Religious organisations based in Italy
1856 establishments in France